Rest of India cricket team is a first-class cricket team in India that continually changes, being composed from players across the country except for those from the season's current Ranji Trophy winner. It annually competes against the Ranji Trophy winner for the Irani Cup, "The Best vs Best of the Rest" tournament. The team was officially instituted in season 1959–60, playing its first match on 18 March 1960 against the Bombay cricket team (now Mumbai). Rest of India has won the tournament 27 times and shared the trophy twice (with Bombay in 1965-66 and Delhi in 1979–80).

Captains

Current Team (for 2019-20 Irani Cup)

Other forms 
The Board of Control for Cricket in India has named other Rest of India teams. These have played tour matches against international teams, and in 1971-1972 played a series of 3 first-class matches against the Indian national cricket team to raise funds for defence forces. A List A "Best vs Best of the Rest" match was organized between Rest of India and the winner of 1989-90 Deodhar Trophy, West Zone, on 2 October 1989.

References 

First-class cricket teams
Cricket in India
Irani Cup